Aggelos Zefkis (born 15 April 2003) is a Cypriot footballer who plays as a winger for Olympiakos Nicosia.

References

Living people
2003 births
Cypriot footballers
Omonia V.C. players
Olympiakos Nicosia players
ASIL Lysi players
Karmiotissa FC players